The Mayor of Mogadishu is head of the executive branch of Mogadishu, the capital of Somalia. The mayor's office administers all city services, public property, police and fire protection, most public agencies, and enforces laws within the city. Mayor Omar Muhamoud Finnish was appointed on 22 August 2019 and succeeded the Martyr Mayor Abdirahman Omar Osman, who died on 1 August 2019 from a suicide bombing that occurred 24 July 2019 inside the mayor's office.

The mayor's office is located in Mogadishu City Hall, which was recently renovated after years of abandonment and decay during the Somali Civil War. The mayor is not elected, but is appointed by the President of Somalia. The mayor also holds the title of Governor of Benaadir, an administrative region whose territory is coextensive with the city of Mogadishu.

History of the office 
The first mayor of Mogadishu was Romeo Campani, an Italian expatriate who was appointed by General Rodolfo Graziani, the Governor of Italian Somaliland. Beginning in 1953 with the appointment of Cali Cumar Sheegow, the office of mayor has been held by native Somalis. After Somalian independence from Italy in 1960, the mayor has been appointed by the President of Somalia.

List of mayors

Colonial mayors and first Somali mayor in colonial era 
The following mayors of Mogadishu were appointed by the Governor of Italian Somaliland. From 1941 to 1949, resulting from World War II, the British occupied the territory and appointed the mayors, who remained Italians. Beginning in 1953, native Somalis were appointed to the office.